The Day Finger Pickers Took Over the World is an album by American guitarist Chet Atkins and Australian guitarist Tommy Emmanuel. Recorded when Atkins was 73, this was his last release of original material in the 20th century. "Smokey Mountain Lullaby" was nominated for the 1997 Grammy Award for Country Instrumental Performance.

Reception

Richard S. Ginell from AllMusic said "Chet Atkins still had another great recording in him." adding "Atkins' tune "Tip Toe Through the Bluegrass" plays the two styles off each other quite revealingly. Emmanuel turns out to be a top-notch tunesmith in his own right, too. His "Dixie McGuire" a disarmingly affectionate mid-tempo tune that won't let you go, inspires a performance that is one of the high points of Atkins'." Ginell said "The title track, which Atkins adapted from a lyric that dealt with bass players finds the two reciting and singing a mock-horror flick tale -- and "Ode to Mel Bay" good-naturedly mocks beginning string players everywhere." Country Standard Time called it "yet another superb collaborative effort."

Track listing

Personnel
 Chet Atkins – guitar
 Tommy Emmanuel – guitar, bass, brushes
 Randy Goodrum – keyboards
 Johnny Gimble – fiddle
 Clark Hagen – guitar
 Paul Yandell – guitar
 Giles Reeves – drums, double bass
 Terry McMillan – conga, harmonica, Jew's harp

References

1997 albums
Tommy Emmanuel albums
Chet Atkins albums
Collaborative albums